Kautto is a Finnish surname. Notable people with the surname include:

Jani Kautto (born 1989), Finnish ice hockey player
Juho Kautto (born 1971), Finnish politician

Finnish-language surnames